Lithgow may refer to:

 Lithgow, New South Wales, a town in the Central Tablelands of New South Wales, Australia
 City of Lithgow, an Australian local government area 
 Lithgow (surname), a surname of Scottish origin
 Lithgow, New York, a hamlet in Dutchess County, New York, United States

See also
 
 
 Lithgows, a Scottish company
 Lythgoe, a surname